The PFL 1 mixed martial arts event for the 2019 season of the Professional Fighters League was held on May 9, 2019, at the Nassau Coliseum in Uniondale, New York. This was the first regular season event of the tournament and included fights in the welterweight and women's lightweight divisions.

Background

Kayla Harrison was originally scheduled to face Svetlana Khautova in the main event. However, on May 6, it was announced that Khautova had pulled out of the bout due to injury and was replaced by Larissa Pacheco.

Results

Standings After Event
The PFL points system is based on results of the match.  The winner of a fight receives 3 points.  If the fight ends in a draw, both fighters will receive 1 point. The bonus for winning a fight in the first, second, or third round is 3 points, 2 points, and 1 point respectively. The bonus for winning in the third round requires a fight be stopped before 4:59 of the third round.  No bonus point will be awarded if a fighter wins via decision.  For example, if a fighter wins a fight in the first round, then the fighter will receive 6 total points. A decision win will result in three total points.  If a fighter misses weight, the opponent (should they comply with weight limits) will receive 3 points due to a walkover victory, regardless of winning or losing the bout;  if the non-offending fighter subsequently wins with a stoppage, all bonus points will be awarded.

Welterweight

Women's Lightweight

See also
List of PFL events
List of current PFL fighters

References

Professional Fighters League
2019 in mixed martial arts
Mixed martial arts in New York (state)
Sports in Long Island
2019 in sports in New York (state)
May 2019 sports events in the United States
Events on Long Island
Events in Uniondale, New York